Malcolm Cameron Peyton (born January 12, 1932, New York City) is an American composer, concert director, conductor, and teacher.

Biography
Peyton grew up in Princeton, New Jersey and received early classical training in piano starting at age 6, and in trumpet starting at age 9.  From 1950 to 1956 he attended Princeton University for both undergraduate and graduate training in musical composition, studying with Edward Cone and Roger Sessions, and was awarded a Woodrow Wilson National Fellowship. In 1956–57 Peyton traveled on a Fulbright Scholarship to Germany to study with Wolfgang Fortner. From 1958 through 1961 Peyton, along with Edward Cone and William Carlin, initiated a series of contemporary chamber music concerts in New York presenting many new works.

After joining the faculty at New England Conservatory (NEC) in 1965, Peyton directed with Lyle Davidson Evenings of New Music, the first continuous contemporary music series at NEC, until 1972.  Since then Peyton has directed the Composer's Series at NEC, presenting works by faculty, invited guests, and students in NEC's Jordan Hall.  Peyton lectured at Boston University in 1975 and at Princeton University in 1978. In 1980 Peyton was appointed chairman of composition at NEC, a position in which he served for many years.  In 1995, he conducted the premier of Robert Ceely's Automobile Graveyard, a full-length opera staged in Jordan Hall.

Peyton has received awards from the Academy and Institute of Arts and Letters, the National Endowment for the Arts, and the Norlin Foundation.  His works are published by Boelke-Bomart/Mobart and the Association for the Promotion of New Music, and recorded on the CRI and Centaur labels.

Notable students of Malcolm Peyton include Slovenian composer Igor Krivokapič and American composer Karen Tarlow.

List of compositions
 2 Pieces for String Orchestra (first performance by Princeton Symphony Orchestra; Nicholas Harsanyi, conductor; 1955)
 Suite for Clarinet (George Jones, clarinet; 1955)
 Chamber Cantata Part I (Susan Miller, soprano; Ray DeVoll, tenor; Gustav Meier, conductor; 1958)
 Chamber Cantata  Part II (Bethany Beardslee, soprano; Ray DeVoll, tenor; Gustav Meier, conductor; 1959)
 Concerto for Violin and Orchestra (Princeton Symphony Orchestra; Joseph Kovacs, violin; Nicholas Harsanyi, conductor;  1960)
 Songs from Shakespeare (Shirley Suddock, mezzo-soprano; Gustav Meier, conductor;  1960)
 Sonnets from John Donne (Jesse Coston, bass-baritone; New England Conservatory Contemporary Ensemble; Gunther Schuller, conductor; 1968)
 Choruses from ee cummings (New England conservatory Chorus; Lorna Cooke deVaron, conductor; 1969)
 ‘Cello  Piece (Ronald Clearfield, violoncello; 1972)
 The Blessed Virgin Compared to the Air We Breathe (New England Conservatory Concert Choir; Lorna Cooke deVaron; 1974)
 Elegie, Berceuse for solo viola (1978)
 Songs from Walt Whitman (Bethany Beardslee, soprano; Malcolm Peyton, piano; Eric Rosenblith, violin; 1979)
 Concertine (Collage; Gunther Schuller, conductor; 1981)
 Fantasies for Winds, Brass & Percussion (Swedish Wind Symphony Orchestra; Larry Livingston, conductor; 1982)
 Suite Nocturnale for viola solo (Jonathan Bagg, viola; 1986)
 Songs from T. Sturge Moore (Barbara Winchester, soprano; Dinosaur Annex Music Ensemble; Malcolm Peyton, conductor; 1989)
 String Quartet (Borromeo String Quartet; 1994)
 Envoi for solo flute (1992)
 Apostroph (1997)
 String Quartet No. 2 (Ciompi Quartet 2001; Fibonacci Quartet 2005)
 Tango Steps (Cyrus Stevens, violin; Donald Berman, piano; 2005)
 Overture for Piano (Katie Reimer, piano; 2005)
 Lyric Meditations (Gregorio Rangell; 2009)

References

External links
NEC Faculty: Malcolm C. Peyton
Mimesis Ensemble - Malcolm Peyton
Boston Modern Orchestra Project - Malcolm Peyton
Boston Composers Project - Malcolm Peyton

American male classical composers
American classical composers
20th-century classical composers
Living people
1932 births
New England Conservatory faculty
Musicians from New York City
Princeton University alumni
Pupils of Edward T. Cone
20th-century American composers
Classical musicians from New York (state)
20th-century American male musicians
Fulbright alumni